This list of hot drinks comprises drinks that are typically served hot. Drinks are liquids specifically prepared for human consumption.


Hot drinks

Indonesia

India
There are many hot beverages that originated from India that have gained popularity in other countries. For example, chai (also known as masala chai) is a spiced milk tea that has become very popular throughout the world. Coffee also became a popular hot beverage in India, especially filtered coffee.

See also

 Coffee culture
 Coffeehouse
 Coffee service
 Drinking
 International Coffee Day
 Tea culture
 Tea house
 List of beverages – categorically organized article along with information about primary topics and list article links
 List of Chinese teas
 List of chocolate beverages
 List of coffee beverages
 Lists of beverages – index of beverage list articles on Wikipedia

References

Bibliography

External links

 "Hot Drinks in Malaysia" (report). Euromonitor International. June 2014. 

 
Lists of drinks